A hut is a small dwelling, which may be constructed of various local materials. Huts are a type of vernacular architecture because they are built of readily available materials such as wood, snow, ice, stone, grass, palm leaves, branches, hides, fabric, or mud using techniques passed down through the generations.

The construction of a hut is generally less complex than that of a house (durable, well-built dwelling) but more so than that of a shelter (place of refuge or safety) such as a tent and is used as temporary or seasonal shelter or as a permanent dwelling in some indigenous societies.

Huts exist in practically all nomadic cultures. Some huts are transportable and can stand most conditions of weather.

Word 
The term is often employed by people who consider non-western style homes in tropical and sub-tropical areas to be crude or primitive, but often the designs are based on traditions of local craftsmanship using sophisticated architectural techniques. The designs in tropical and sub-tropical areas favour high airflow configurations built from non-conducting materials, which allow heat dissipation. The term house or home is considered by some to be more appropriate.

In the Western world the word hut is often used for a wooden shed.

The term has also been adopted by climbers and backpackers to refer to a more solid and permanent structure offering refuge. These vary from simple bothies – which are little more than very basic shelters – to mountain huts that are far more luxurious and can even include facilities such as restaurants.

The word comes from the 1650s, from French hutte "cottage" (16c.), from Middle High German hütte "cottage, hut," probably from Proto-Germanic *hudjon-, related to the root of Old English hydan "to hide," from PIE *keudh-, from root (s)keu- (see hide (n.1)). Apparently first in English as a military word. Old Saxon hutta, Danish hytte, Swedish hytta, West Frisian and Middle Dutch hutte, Dutch hut are from High German. Ukrainian "hata" seems to be known from even earlier ages. Avestan or ancient Iranian origins presumably." related to hide, a covering.

Modern use 

Huts are used by shepherds when moving livestock between seasonal grazing areas such as mountainous and lowland pastures (transhumance).

They are also commonly used by backpackers and other travelers in rural areas.

Some displaced populations of people use huts throughout the world during a diaspora. For example, temporary collectors in the wilderness agricultural workers at plantations in the Amazon jungle.

Huts have been built for purposes other than as a dwelling such as storage, workshops, and teaching.

Types

Traditional
 Bahay kubo – A traditional Filipino stilt house made of bamboo and palm fronds as roofing. They are designed to be lightweight so they can be moved from one place to another by being carried by group of men, a practice commonly called bayanihan.
 Balok – A Siberian wilderness hut made of logs, usually communal, used by hunters, fishermen and travelers in the more distant parts of Siberia. Some baloks are mobile and mounted on sleds.
 Barabara – An earth sheltered winter home of the Aleut people
 Barracks – an old term for a temporary hut, now more used as a term for military housing and a unique hay storage structure called a hay barrack.
 Bothy – Originally a one-room hut for male farm workers in the United Kingdom, now a mountain hut for overnight hikers.
 Burdei or bordei – a dugout or pit-house with a sod roof in Romania, Ukraine and Canada.
 Cabana – an open shelter
 Chozo – Spanish for hut, term also used in Mexico.
 Clochán – A dry stone hut in Ireland
 Dry stone hut
 Earth lodge – Native American dwelling
 Heartebeest Hut – hut used by South African Trekboer built of reeds, sometimes plastered with mud 
 Hytte – A cabin or hut in Norway
 Igloo – A hut made of pieces of hard snow or ice
 Kolba – Afghanistan
 Khata – a Ukrainian hut
 Lodge is a general term for a hut or cabin such as a log cabin or cottage. Lodge is used to refer to a tipi, sweat lodge, and hunting, fishing, skiing, and safari lodge.
 Mitato – A small, dry stone hut in Greece
 Orri – A French dry stone and sod hut
 Rondavel – Central and South Africa
 Roundhouse (dwelling) – a circular hut or house typically with a conical roof
 Sheiling – Originally a temporary shelter or hut for shepherds, now may be a stone building. Common in Scotland.
 Sod house – A pioneer house type on the American Plains where wood was scarce.
 Sukkah – Israel and Jewish diaspora
 Trullo - Dry stone hut in Puglia, Italy
 Tule hut – Coastal North America, West Coast, Northern California
 Oca – Brazil
 Quinzhee – A shelter made in a pile of snow
 Yurt – Central and North Asia

Modern
 HORSA hut – A prefabricated school building built to cope with additional demand from the Education Act 1944
 Laing hut – prefabricated lightweight timber wall sections bolted together, externally clad with plasterboard and felt. Designed 1940 for barrack accommodation
 Nissen hut – a prefabricated steel structure made from a semicircle of corrugated steel invented 1st quarter 20th century.
 Jamesway hut – a variation of a Nissen hut
 Romney hut – a variation of a Nissen hut
 Quonset hut – a type of Nissen hut of lightweight prefabricated structure of corrugated steel having a semicircular cross section
 Pratten hut – A prefabricated building generally used in schools for classrooms in the UK after World War 2.
 Scout hut – Term given for the buildings used as the meeting place of members of The Scout Association world-wide.

Construction 

Many huts are designed to be relatively quick and inexpensive to build.  Construction often does not require specialized tools or knowledge.

Marketing usage 
The term Hut is also used to name many commercial stores, companies, and concepts.  The name implies a small, casual venue, often with a fun and friendly atmosphere.  Examples include Pizza Hut and Sunglass Hut. Kiosks may be constructed to look like huts and are often found at parks, malls, beaches, or other public places, selling a variety of inexpensive food or goods.  Luxury hotels in tropical areas where guests are assigned to occupy their own freestanding structure sometimes call the structure a "hut", though such huts typically bear little more than superficial resemblance to the traditional concept of a hut.

See also

 Architecture of Africa
 Cabane en pierre sèche
 Lean-to – a type of shelter
 Mountain hut - building that provides food and shelter for hikers and mountaineers
 Palloza – Spanish type of roundhouse
 The Primitive Hut – concept in architectural theory
 Tipi – Central North America tent

References 

 
Traditional Native American dwellings
Vernacular architecture